Bentla D'Coth is a football referee and former footballer from India. She is the first woman to be an international football referee from South Asia.

References

External links 
 

Articles created or expanded during Women's History Month (India) - 2014
Living people
Indian women's footballers
India women's international footballers
Indian football referees
Women association football referees
Footballers from Kerala
Sportswomen from Kerala
Year of birth missing (living people)
Footballers at the 1998 Asian Games
Asian Games competitors for India
Women's association footballers not categorized by position
Indian football coaches